Jed McCaleb is an American programmer, entrepreneur and philanthropist. He is a co-founder and the CTO of Stellar. Prior to co-founding Stellar, McCaleb founded and served as the CTO of the company Ripple until 2013. McCaleb is also known for creating the Mt. Gox bitcoin exchange, and the peer-to-peer eDonkey and Overnet networks as well as the eDonkey2000 application.

As of March 2023, McCaleb is worth US$2.4 billion according to Forbes Billionaires List.

Early life and education
McCaleb was born in Fayetteville, Arkansas, and attended the University of California, Berkeley. He eventually dropped out and moved to New York City.

Career

In 2000, McCaleb founded MetaMachine Inc. and released his eDonkey2000 application. Sam Yagan joined him in 2001 and served as CEO of the company. McCaleb served as the CTO of the company and continued to develop the peer-to-peer eDonkey network as well as the Overnet network and the eDonkey2000 application. At its height, the network grew to have over 4 million active users at any given time. In September 2006, the company reached a settlement with the RIAA and agreed that the company and its top executives would "immediately cease distributing eDonkey, eDonkey2000, Overnet and other software versions" and the company would pay $30 million to the RIAA to avoid copyright infringement lawsuits. 

In 2007, he purchased the domain Mtgox.com with the intent to create a trading site for Magic: The Gathering cards. After moving on from his original idea, McCaleb repurposed the site in late 2010 as a bitcoin exchange that could process bitcoin-to-dollar trades. The website grew in popularity within months. McCaleb sold the company to Mark Karpelès in February 2011 and remained a minority owner in the company until its collapse in 2014.

In 2011, McCaleb began developing a digital currency in which transactions were verified by consensus among network members which became known as the Ripple protocol, which differs from the mining technique used in bitcoin. He recruited David Schwartz and secured an investment from Jesse Powell before adding Arthur Britto as the chief strategist. McCaleb recruited Chris Larsen to be CEO of the new company, which became known as Opencoin. He continued development of the Ripple protocol and its currency while securing investments before McCaleb left his active role with the company in July 2013.

In 2014, he co-founded the non-profit organization the Stellar Development Foundation with Joyce Kim to develop the Stellar open source protocol to allow cross-border monetary transactions including fiat and digital currencies. The organization debuted on July 31, 2014, and received $3 million loan from the technology company, Stripe. The organization originally based its payment network on the Ripple protocol McCaleb previously developed but in 2015 adopted the Stellar Consensus Protocol. McCaleb serves as chief technology officer of Stellar. 

In May 2017, McCaleb also launched Lightyear.io, a commercial endeavor building on the Stellar network. Lightyear facilitates Stellar becoming a global payment and currency exchange initially directed at the developing world. In October 2017, Lightyear partnered with IBM to launch blockchain banking in the South Pacific using Stellar's lumen currency. In September 2018, McCaleb negotiated the merger of Lightyear and Chain.com creating the new merged entity named InterStellar.

The New York Times named McCaleb one of the top 10 people leading the blockchain revolution in 2018.

Philanthropy
McCaleb donated US$500,000 worth of XRP (at the time of donation) to the Machine Intelligence Research Institute (MIRI), and remains one of its largest donors, as well as joining its advisory board. In February 2018, McCaleb was announced as a new donor to the artificial intelligence research group OpenAI.

References

External links
 

American computer programmers
1975 births
Living people
Businesspeople from Arkansas
People from Fayetteville, Arkansas
University of California, Berkeley alumni
People associated with cryptocurrency